Berchtesgaden National Park is in the south of Germany, on its border with Austria, in the municipalities of Ramsau bei Berchtesgaden and Schönau am Königsee, Berchtesgadener Land, Free State of Bavaria. The national park was established in 1978 to protect the landscapes of the Berchtesgaden Alps. Headquartered in the town of Berchtesgaden, the park was designated a UNESCO Biosphere Reserve in 1990.

Location and geography

The park is located in the mountainous area south of the town of Berchtesgaden. The eastern, southern, and western boundaries of the park coincide with the state border between Germany and Austria. The area of the park is economically undeveloped, and there are no settlements. In the center of the park is a large lake, the Königssee, which is elongated from the south to the west and is the source of the Königsseer Ache, a right tributary of the Salzach. A smaller lake, the Obersee, is located above the Königssee and drains into it. The whole area of the park belongs to the drainage basin of the Salzach, and, consequently, of the Danube. West of the lake is the massif of Watzmann, and beyond that, separated by the Wimbachtal valley, the massif of Hochkalter. The Watzmann is the third highest mountain massif in Germany. The Watzmann Glacier, located below the eastern face of the Watzmann, and the Blaueis, adjacent to the Hochkalter, are two of the five glaciers in Germany.

The park also contains the Hintersee.

History
The first nature conservation area in the Berchtesgaden Alps was created in what is currently the southeastern part of the park in 1910. In 1919, the mountain hotel of St. Bartolomew was built. At the time, it included both the Watzmann and the Hochkalter. During World War II, Hermann Göring, who, among other responsibilities, was the State Minister of Forestry and Hunting, declared the area around Obersee a particularly protected natural conservation area. In addition, six areas formally protecting the fauna were designated. In practice, they were used for hunting. The initiative to create a national park was first introduced in 1953. In the 1960s, a concurrent initiative to build an aerial lift to the summit of Watzmann was put forward. It clearly contradicted the plans for creation of a national park, and in the end it was abandoned in 1972 by the decision of the Free State of Bavaria, which also decided to create a national park. In 1990, the national park was recognized by UNESCO as a Biosphere Reserve. In 2010, the park was expanded.

Tourism
There are six information centers, located in Berchtesgaden, in Ramsau, and inside the park. The park maintains an extensive network of trails. One of the cultural attractions of the park is the pilgrimage Church of Saint Bartholomew, located on the Königssee.

See also
 List of national parks of Germany

References

Notes

Sources

External links

 

Protected areas of Bavaria
National parks of Germany
Protected areas established in 1978
1978 establishments in West Germany
Protected areas of the Alps